The 39th British Academy Film Awards, given by the British Academy of Film and Television Arts in 1986, honoured the best films of 1985.

There are no records showing any nominations, or a winner, for the BAFTA Award for Best Direction at this ceremony.

Winners and nominees

 BAFTA Fellowship: Steven Spielberg
 BAFTA Outstanding British Contribution to Cinema Award: Sydney Samuelson

Statistics

See also
 58th Academy Awards
 11th César Awards
 38th Directors Guild of America Awards
 43rd Golden Globe Awards
 6th Golden Raspberry Awards
 1st Independent Spirit Awards
 12th Saturn Awards
 38th Writers Guild of America Awards

References

1985 film awards
1986 in British cinema
Film039
1985 awards in the United Kingdom